The 2022 Thailand Open was a badminton tournament that took place at Impact Arena in Pak Kret, Thailand, from 17 to 22 May 2022. The tournament had a total prize pool of $360,000.

Tournament
The 2022 Thailand Open was the ninth tournament of the 2022 BWF World Tour and was part of the Thailand Open championships, which had been held since 1984. This tournament was organized by the Badminton Association of Thailand with sanction from the BWF.

Venue
This international tournament was held at the Impact Arena in Pak Kret, Nonthaburi, Thailand.

Point distribution
Below is the point distribution table for each phase of the tournament based on the BWF points system for the BWF World Tour Super 500 event.

Prize pool
The total prize money was US$360,000 with the distribution of the prize money in accordance with BWF regulations.

Men's singles

Seeds 

 Viktor Axelsen (second round)
 Kento Momota (first round)
 Anders Antonsen (first round)
 Chou Tien-chen (first round)
 Anthony Sinisuka Ginting (withdrew)
 Lee Zii Jia (champion)
 Jonatan Christie (withdrew)
 Srikanth Kidambi (second round)

Finals

Top half

Section 1

Section 2

Bottom half

Section 3

Section 4

Women's singles

Seeds 

 Tai Tzu-ying (champion)
 Akane Yamaguchi (quarter-finals)
 Chen Yufei (final)
 An Se-young (first round)
 Nozomi Okuhara (second round)
 P. V. Sindhu (semi-finals)
 Ratchanok Intanon (semi-finals)
 He Bingjiao (quarter-finals)

Finals

Top half

Section 1

Section 2

Bottom half

Section 3

Section 4

Men's doubles

Seeds 

 Mohammad Ahsan / Hendra Setiawan (quarter-finals)
 Lee Yang / Wang Chi-lin (quarter-finals)
 Takuro Hoki / Yugo Kobayashi (champions)
 Satwiksairaj Rankireddy / Chirag Shetty (withdrew)
 Fajar Alfian / Muhammad Rian Ardianto  (final)
 Aaron Chia / Soh Wooi Yik (semi-finals)
 Kim Astrup / Anders Skaarup Rasmussen (semi-finals)
 Ong Yew Sin / Teo Ee Yi (withdrew)

Finals

Top half

Section 1

Section 2

Bottom half

Section 3

Section 4

Women's doubles

Seeds 

 Chen Qingchen / Jia Yifan (quarter-finals)
 Lee So-hee / Shin Seung-chan (quarter-finals)
 Kim So-yeong / Kong Hee-yong (first round)
 Yuki Fukushima / Sayaka Hirota (quarter-finals)
 Mayu Matsumoto / Wakana Nagahara (final)
 Nami Matsuyama / Chiharu Shida (champions)
 Pearly Tan / Thinaah Muralitharan (semi-finals)
 Maiken Fruergaard / Sara Thygesen (second round)

Finals

Top half

Section 1

Section 2

Bottom half

Section 3

Section 4

Mixed doubles

Seeds 

 Dechapol Puavaranukroh / Sapsiree Taerattanachai (final)
 Zheng Siwei / Huang Yaqiong (champions)
 Yuta Watanabe / Arisa Higashino (semi-finals)
 Wang Yilyu / Huang Dongping (semi-finals)
 Tan Kian Meng / Lai Pei Jing (first round)
 Goh Soon Huat / Shevon Jemie Lai (quarter-finals)
 Mathias Christiansen / Alexandra Bøje (second round)
 Yuki Kaneko / Misaki Matsutomo (second round)

Finals

Top half

Section 1

Section 2

Bottom half

Section 3

Section 4

References

External links
 Tournament Link

Thailand Open (badminton)
Thailand Open
Thailand Open
Thailand Open